Ballintogher is a village in County Sligo, Ireland. It is located approximately 8 kilometers southeast of the county town of Sligo on the R290 road between Ballygawley to the west and Dromahair in County Leitrim to the north-east. Known as "The Town of the Causeway", Ballintogher is situated near Lough Gill, and the "Lake Isle of Innisfree" made famous by the poet W. B. Yeats.

Ballintogher was located near the Sligo, Leitrim and Northern Counties Railway, which was begun in the 1870s and closed in 1957. The village had a population of 331 people as of the 2016 census.

References

Towns and villages in County Sligo